Dimethylbutane (DMB) may refer to:

 2,2-Dimethylbutane
 2,3-Dimethylbutane

See also
 Dimethylbutanol

Alkanes